Pacificateur may refer to:

, a Téméraire-class 74-gun ship of the line
, a Bucentaure-class 80-gun ship of the line

French Navy ship names